Syrena Record was a Polish record company.

The company was established in 1904 by Juliusz Fejgenbaum, a Warsaw businessman-industrialist. It took the name of Syrena Rekord in 1908. The company produced gramophone records till the invasion of Poland in 1939. The company's discography includes around 14,000 titles.

Henryk Wars  was a long-time music director for Syrena Rekord.

References  

Syrena early history - Juliette Bretan
Syrena interwar history - Juliette Bretan

Polish record labels
Defunct record labels
Record labels established in 1904
Companies set up in the Second Republic of Poland